Noha Yossry (born February 7, 1992, in Cairo) is an Egyptian table tennis player. She won a silver medal, as a member of the Egyptian table tennis team, at the 2007 All-Africa Games in Algiers, Algeria. As of March 2013, Yossry is ranked no. 669 in the world by the International Table Tennis Federation (ITTF). She is also right-handed, and uses the classic grip.

Yossry qualified for the women's singles tournament at the 2008 Summer Olympics in Beijing, by receiving a place as one of the top 6 seeded players from the All-Africa Games in Algiers, Algeria. She lost the preliminary round match to Ukraine's Tetyana Sorochinskaya, with a unanimous set score of 0–4.

References

External links
 
 NBC 2008 Olympics profile

1992 births
Living people
Egyptian female table tennis players
Table tennis players at the 2008 Summer Olympics
Olympic table tennis players of Egypt
Sportspeople from Cairo
African Games medalists in table tennis
African Games silver medalists for Egypt
Competitors at the 2007 All-Africa Games